Helaman is the religious leader and soldier from Mormon scripture, and the son of Alma the Younger.

Helaman may also refer to:
 Book of Helaman, called Helaman for short
 Helaman, son of Helaman, aka Helaman II, Nephite prophet who lived around 30 BC
 Helaman (ca 130 BC), a son of King Benjamin